British musician Julian Lennon has issued many recordings since 1984. Some of his singles, such as "Too Late for Goodbyes", have reached the top position in various charts.

Albums

Studio albums

Compilation albums

Singles

Guest appearances
 Dave Clark's Time: Original Soundtrack (1986)
 Mike Batt's The Hunting of the Snark (1986); vocals on song "Midnight Smoke"
 Hail! Hail! Rock 'n' Roll (1987); vocals on song "Johnny B. Goode"
 The Wonder Years: Music From the Emmy Award-Winning Show & Its Era (1989); vocals on song "Ruby Tuesday"
 Toy Matinee (1989); vocals on songs "Turn It On Salvador" and "Things She Said"
 Mr. Holland's Opus – Soundtrack (1996); co-wrote and vocals on "Cole's Song"
 Lennon... and Proud of It – A Conversation with Julian Lennon (1999)
 Hisss (Original Motion Picture Soundtrack) (2010) - co-wrote and vocals on song "Sway"
 Shine On! Songs Volume One (2011); song "Children Of The World"
 Tony Mortimer - Songs From The Suitcase album (2013); vocals on song "Rain In England"
 Summertime with Meninos do Morumbi  (2014)
 Glass Tiger - 31 album (2018); vocals on song "Thin Red Line"
 Dennis DeYoung - 26 East, Volume 1 album (2020); vocals on song "To the Good Old Days"
Karma Police feat. Nuno Bettencourt; lead vocals
Source:

References 

Discographies of British artists